John Caldwell Calhoun (March 18, 1782March 31, 1850) was an American statesman and political theorist from South Carolina who held many important positions including being the seventh vice president of the United States from 1825 to 1832. He adamantly defended slavery and sought to protect the interests of the white South. He began his political career as a nationalist, modernizer, and proponent of a strong national government and protective tariffs. In the late 1820s, his views changed radically, and he became a leading proponent of states' rights, limited government, nullification, and opposition to high tariffs. He saw Northern acceptance of those policies as a condition of the South remaining in the Union. His beliefs and warnings heavily influenced the South's secession from the Union in 1860–1861. He was the first vice president to resign from the position, and the only one to do so until Spiro Agnew resigned in 1973.

Calhoun began his political career with election to the House of Representatives in 1810. As a prominent leader of the war hawk faction, Calhoun strongly supported the War of 1812. He served as Secretary of War under President James Monroe and, in that position, reorganized and modernized the War Department. Calhoun was a candidate for the presidency in the 1824 election. After failing to gain support, he agreed to be a candidate for vice president. The Electoral College elected Calhoun vice president by an overwhelming majority. He served under John Quincy Adams and continued under Andrew Jackson (who defeated Adams in the election of 1828, making Calhoun the most recent U.S. vice president to serve under two different presidents).  He was also the most recent vice president re-elected until Thomas R. Marshall got re-elected in 1916, 88 years later.

Calhoun had a difficult relationship with Jackson, primarily because of the Nullification Crisis and the Petticoat affair. In contrast with his previous nationalism, Calhoun vigorously supported South Carolina's right to nullify federal tariff legislation that he believed unfairly favored the North, which put him into conflict with unionists such as Jackson. In 1832, with only a few months remaining in his second term, Calhoun resigned as vice president and entered the Senate. He sought the Democratic Party nomination for the presidency in 1844 but lost to surprise nominee James K. Polk, who won the general election. Calhoun served as Secretary of State under President John Tyler from 1844 to 1845, and in that role supported the annexation of Texas as a means to extend the slave power and helped to settle the Oregon boundary dispute with Britain. Calhoun returned to the Senate, where he opposed the Mexican–American War, the Wilmot Proviso, and the Compromise of 1850 before he died in 1850. He often served as a virtual independent who variously aligned as needed, with Democrats and Whigs.

Later in life, Calhoun became known as the "cast-iron man" for his rigid defense of white Southern beliefs and practices. His concept of republicanism emphasized approval of slavery and minority states' rights as particularly embodied by the South. He owned dozens of slaves in Fort Hill, South Carolina. Calhoun asserted that slavery, rather than being a "necessary evil", was a "positive good" that benefited both slaves and owners. To protect minority rights against majority rule, he called for a concurrent majority by which the minority could block some proposals that it felt infringed on their liberties. To that end, Calhoun supported states' rights, and nullification through which states could declare null and void federal laws that they viewed as unconstitutional. He was one of the "Great Triumvirate" or the "Immortal Trio" of Congressional leaders, along with his colleagues Daniel Webster and Henry Clay.

Early life
John Caldwell Calhoun was born in Abbeville District, South Carolina, on March 18, 1782, the fourth child of Patrick Calhoun (1727–1796) and his wife Martha (Caldwell). He was a member of the  well known Calhoun family. Patrick's father, also named Patrick Calhoun, had joined the Scotch-Irish immigration movement from County Donegal to southwestern Pennsylvania. After the death of the elder Patrick in 1741, the family moved to southwestern Virginia. Following the defeat of British General Edward Braddock at the Battle of the Monongahela in 1755, the family, fearing Indian attacks, moved to South Carolina in 1756.

Patrick Calhoun belonged to the Calhoun clan in the tight-knit Scotch-Irish community on the Southern frontier. He was known as an Indian fighter and an ambitious surveyor, farmer, planter, and politician, elected to the South Carolina Legislature. As a Presbyterian, he stood opposed to the established Anglican planter elite based in Charleston. He was not a patriot in the American Revolution and opposed ratification of the federal Constitution on grounds of states' rights and personal liberties. Calhoun would eventually adopt his father's states' rights beliefs.

Young Calhoun showed scholastic talent, and although schools were scarce on the Carolina frontier, he was enrolled briefly in an academy in Appling, Georgia. It soon closed. He continued his studies privately. When his father died, his brothers were away starting business careers, and so the 14-year-old Calhoun took over management of the family farm and five other farms. For four years he simultaneously kept up his reading and his hunting and fishing. The family decided he should continue his education, and so he resumed studies at the academy after it reopened.

With financing from his brothers, he went to Yale College in Connecticut in 1802. For the first time in his life, Calhoun encountered serious, advanced, well-organized intellectual dialogue that could shape his mind. Yale was dominated by President Timothy Dwight, a Federalist who became his mentor. Dwight's brilliance entranced (and sometimes repelled) Calhoun.

Biographer John Niven says:

Dwight repeatedly denounced Jeffersonian democracy, and Calhoun challenged him in class. Dwight could not shake Calhoun's commitment to republicanism. "Young man," retorted Dwight, "your talents are of a high order and might justify you for any station, but I deeply regret that you do not love sound principles better than sophistry—you seem to possess a most unfortunate bias for error." Dwight also expounded on the strategy of secession from the Union as a legitimate solution for New England's disagreements with the national government.

Calhoun made friends easily, read widely, and was a noted member of the debating society of Brothers in Unity. He graduated as valedictorian in 1804. He studied law at the nation's first independent law school, Tapping Reeve Law School in Litchfield, Connecticut, where he worked with Tapping Reeve and James Gould. He was admitted to the South Carolina bar in 1807.

Biographer Margaret Coit argues that:

Personal life

In January 1811, Calhoun married Floride Bonneau Colhoun, a first cousin once removed. She was the daughter of wealthy United States Senator and lawyer John  E. Colhoun, a leader of Charleston high society.

The couple had 10 children over 18 years:

 Andrew Pickens (1811-1865)
 Floride Pure (1814-1815)
 Jane (1816-1816)
 Anna Maria (1817-1875)--married Thomas Green Clemson, who later founded Clemson University in South Carolina.
 Elizabeth (1819-1820)
 Patrick (1821-1858)
 John Caldwell Jr. (1823-1850)
 Martha Cornelia (1824-1857)
 James Edward (1826-1861)
 William Lowndes (1829-1858)

Calhoun was not openly religious. He was raised as an orthodox Presbyterian, but he was attracted to Southern varieties of Unitarianism of the sort that attracted Jefferson. Southern Unitarianism was generally less organized than the variety popular in New England. He was generally not outspoken about his religious beliefs. After his marriage, Calhoun and his wife attended the Episcopal Church, of which she was a member. In 1821 he became a founding member of All Souls Unitarian Church in Washington, D.C.

Historian Merrill D. Peterson describes Calhoun: "Intensely serious and severe, he could never write a love poem, though he often tried, because every line began with 'whereas' ..."

House of Representatives

War of 1812
With a base among the Irish and Scotch Irish, Calhoun won election to South Carolina's 6th congressional district of the House of Representatives in 1810. He immediately became a leader of the War Hawks, along with Speaker Henry Clay of Kentucky and South Carolina congressmen William Lowndes and Langdon Cheves. Brushing aside the vehement objections of both anti-war New Englanders and arch-liberal Jeffersonians led by John Randolph of Roanoke, they demanded war against Britain, claiming that American honor and republican values had been violated by the British refusal to recognize American shipping rights. As a member, and later acting chairman, of the Committee on Foreign Affairs, Calhoun played a major role in drafting two key documents in the push for war, the Report on Foreign Relations and the War Report of 1812. Drawing on the linguistic tradition of the Declaration of Independence, Calhoun's committee called for a declaration of war in ringing phrases, denouncing Britain's "lust for power", "unbounded tyranny", and "mad ambition".

The United States declared war on Britain on June 18, inaugurating the War of 1812. The opening phase involved multiple disasters for American arms, as well as a financial crisis when the Treasury could barely pay the bills. The conflict caused economic hardship for Americans, as the Royal Navy blockaded the ports and cut off imports, exports, and the coastal trade. Several attempted invasions of Canada were fiascos, but the U.S. in 1813 seized control of Lake Erie and broke the power of hostile Indians in battles such as the Battle of the Thames in Canada in 1813 and the Battle of Horseshoe Bend in Alabama in 1814. These Indians had, in many cases, cooperated with the British or Spanish in opposing American interests.

Calhoun labored to raise troops, provide funds, speed logistics, rescue the currency, and regulate commerce to aid the war effort. One colleague hailed him as "the young Hercules who carried the war on his shoulders". Disasters on the battlefield made him double his legislative efforts to overcome the obstructionism of John Randolph, Daniel Webster, and other opponents of the war. By 1814  the British were thwarted at the invasions of New York and Baltimore, but Napoleon Bonaparte capitulated, meaning America would now face Britain's formidable renforcement with units previously committed to Europe if the war were to continue. British and American diplomats signed the Treaty of Ghent undertaking a return to the borders of 1812 with no gains or losses. Before the treaty reached the Senate for ratification, and even before news of its signing reached New Orleans, a British invasion force was decisively defeated in January 1815 at the Battle of New Orleans, making a national hero of General Andrew Jackson. Americans celebrated what they called a "second war of independence" against Britain. This led to the beginning of the "Era of Good Feelings", an era marked by the formal demise of the Federalist Party and increased nationalism.

Postwar planning
Despite American successes, the mismanagement of the Army during the war distressed Calhoun, and he resolved to strengthen and centralize the War Department. The militia had proven itself quite unreliable during the war and Calhoun saw the need for a permanent and professional military force. In 1816 he called for building an effective navy, including steam frigates, as well as a standing army of adequate size. The British blockade of the coast had underscored the necessity of rapid means of internal transportation; Calhoun proposed a system of "great permanent roads". The blockade had cut off the import of manufactured items, so he emphasized the need to encourage more domestic manufacture, fully realizing that industry was based in the Northeast. The dependence of the old financial system on import duties was devastated when the blockade cut off imports. Calhoun called for a system of internal taxation that would not collapse from a war-time shrinkage of maritime trade, as the tariffs had done. The expiration of the charter of the First Bank of the United States had also distressed the Treasury, so to reinvigorate and modernize the economy Calhoun called for a new national bank. A new bank was chartered as the Second Bank of the United States by Congress and approved by President James Madison in 1816. Through his proposals, Calhoun emphasized a national footing and downplayed sectionalism and states rights. Historian Ulrich B. Phillips says that at this stage of Calhoun's career, "The word nation was often on his lips, and his conviction was to enhance national unity which he identified with national power"

Rhetorical style
Regarding his career in the House of Representatives, an observer commented that Calhoun was "the most elegant speaker that sits in the House ... His gestures are easy and graceful, his manner forcible, and language elegant; but above all, he confines himself closely to the subject, which he always understands, and enlightens everyone within hearing."

His talent for public speaking required systematic self-discipline and practice. A later critic noted the sharp contrast between his hesitant conversations and his fluent speaking styles, adding that Calhoun "had so carefully cultivated his naturally poor voice as to make his utterance clear, full, and distinct in speaking and while not at all musical it yet fell pleasantly on the ear". Calhoun was "a high-strung man of ultra intellectual cast". As such, Calhoun was not known for charisma. He was often seen as harsh and aggressive with other representatives. But he was a brilliant intellectual orator and strong organizer. Historian Russell Kirk says, "That zeal which flared like Greek fire in Randolph burned in Calhoun, too; but it was contained in the Cast-iron Man as in a furnace, and Calhoun's passion glowed out only through his eyes. No man was more stately, more reserved."

John Quincy Adams concluded in 1821 that "Calhoun is a man of fair and candid mind, of honorable principles, of clear and quick understanding, of cool self-possession, of enlarged philosophical views, and ardent patriotism. He is above all sectional and factious prejudices more than any other statesman of this Union with whom I have ever acted." Historian Charles Wiltse noted Calhoun's evolution, "Though he is known today primarily for his sectionalism, Calhoun was the last of the great political leaders of his time to take a sectional position—later than Daniel Webster, later than Henry Clay, later than Adams himself."

Secretary of War and postwar nationalism

In 1817, the deplorable state of the War Department led four men to decline offers from President James Monroe to accept the office of Secretary of War before Calhoun finally assumed the role. Calhoun took office on December 8 and served until 1825. He continued his role as a leading nationalist during the Era of Good Feelings. He proposed an elaborate program of national reforms to the infrastructure that he believed would speed up economic modernization. His priority was an effective navy, including steam frigates, and in the second place a standing army of adequate size—and as further preparation for an emergency, "great permanent roads", "a certain encouragement" to manufacturers, and a system of internal taxation that would not collapse from a war-time shrinkage of maritime trade, like customs duties.

A reform-minded modernizer, Calhoun attempted to institute centralization and efficiency in the Indian Department and in the Army by establishing new coastal and frontier fortifications and building military roads, but Congress either failed to respond to his reforms or responded with hostility. Calhoun's frustration with congressional inaction, political rivalries, and ideological differences spurred him to create the Bureau of Indian Affairs in 1824. The responsibilities of the bureau were to manage treaty negotiations, schools, and trade with Indians, in addition to handling all expenditures and correspondence concerning Indian affairs. Thomas McKenney was appointed as the first head of the bureau.

As secretary, Calhoun had responsibility for the management of Indian affairs. He promoted a plan, adopted by Monroe in 1825, to preserve the sovereignty of eastern Indians by relocating them to western reservations they could control without interference from state governments. In over seven years Calhoun supervised the negotiation and ratification of 40 treaties with Indian tribes. Calhoun opposed the invasion of Spanish Florida launched in 1818 by General Jackson during the First Seminole War, which was done without direct authorization from Calhoun or President Monroe, and in private with other cabinet members, advocated censuring of Jackson as punishment. Calhoun claimed that Jackson had begun a war against Spain in violation of the Constitution and, that he had contradicted Calhoun's explicit orders in doing so. Specific official instructions not to invade Florida or attack the Spanish were not issued by the administration. However, Calhoun supported the execution of Alexander Arbuthnot and Robert Ambrister, two British soldiers living in Florida who were accused of inciting the Seminole to make war against the United States. Calhoun accused the British of being involved in "wickedness, corruption, and barbarity at which the heart sickens and which in this enlightened age it ought not scarcely to be believed that a Christian nation would have participated". He added that he hoped the executions of Arbuthnot and Ambrister would deter the British and any other nations "who by false promises delude and excite an Indian tribe to all the deeds of savage war". The United States annexed Florida from Spain in 1819 through the Adams–Onís Treaty.

Calhoun's tenure as Secretary of War witnessed the outbreak of the Missouri crisis in December 1818, when a petition arrived from Missouri settlers seeking admission into the Union as a slave state. In response, Representative James Tallmadge Jr. of New York proposed two amendments to the bill designed to restrict the spread of slavery into what would become the new state. These amendments touched off an intense debate between North and South that had some talking openly of disunion. In February 1820, Calhoun predicted to Secretary of State John Quincy Adams, a New Englander, that the Missouri issue "would not produce a dissolution" of the Union. "But if it should," Calhoun went on, "the South would of necessity be compelled to form an alliance with...Great Britain." "I said that would be returning to the colonial state," Adams recalled saying afterward. According to Adams, "He said, yes, pretty much, but it would be forced upon them."

After the war ended in 1815 the "Old Republicans" in Congress, with their Jeffersonian ideology for an economy in the federal government, sought to reduce the operations and finances of the War Department. Calhoun's political rivalry with William H. Crawford, the Secretary of the Treasury, over the pursuit of the presidency in the 1824 election, complicated Calhoun's tenure as War Secretary. The general lack of military action following the war meant that a large army, such as that preferred by Calhoun, was no longer considered necessary. The "Radicals", a group of strong states' rights supporters who mostly favored Crawford for president in the coming election, were inherently suspicious of large armies. Some allegedly also wanted to hinder Calhoun's presidential aspirations for that election. Thus, on March 2, 1821, Congress passed the Reduction Act, which reduced the number of enlisted men of the army by half, from 11,709 to 5,586, and the number of the officer corps by a fifth, from 680 to 540. Calhoun, though concerned, offered little protest. Later, to provide the army with a more organized command structure, which had been severely lacking during the War of 1812, he appointed Major General Jacob Brown to a position that would later become known as "Commanding General of the United States Army".

Vice presidency (1825–1832)

1824 and 1828 elections and Adams presidency

Calhoun was initially a candidate for President of the United States in the election of 1824. Four other men also sought the presidency: Andrew Jackson, Adams, Crawford, and Henry Clay. Calhoun failed to win the endorsement of the South Carolina legislature, and his supporters in Pennsylvania decided to abandon his candidacy in favor of Jackson's, and instead supported him for vice president. Other states soon followed, and Calhoun therefore allowed himself to become a candidate for vice president rather than president. The Electoral College elected Calhoun vice president by a landslide on December 1, 1824. He won 182 of 261 electoral votes, while five other men received the remaining votes. No presidential candidate received a majority in the Electoral College, and the election was ultimately resolved by the House of Representatives, where Adams was declared the winner over Crawford and Jackson, who in the election had led Adams in both popular vote and electoral vote. After Clay, the Speaker of the House was appointed Secretary of State by Adams, Jackson's supporters denounced what they considered a "corrupt bargain" between Adams and Clay to give Adams the presidency in exchange for Clay receiving the office of Secretary of State, the holder of which had traditionally become the next president. Calhoun also expressed some concerns, which caused friction between him and Adams.

Calhoun also opposed President Adams' plan to send a delegation to observe a meeting of South and Central American leaders in Panama, believing that the United States should stay out of foreign affairs. Calhoun became disillusioned with Adams' high tariff policies and increased centralization of government through a network of "internal improvements", which he now saw as a threat to the rights of the states. Calhoun wrote to Jackson on June 4, 1826, informing him that he would support Jackson's second campaign for the presidency in 1828. The two were never particularly close friends. Calhoun never fully trusted Jackson, a frontiersman and popular war hero, but hoped that his election would bring some reprieve from Adams's anti-states' rights policies. Jackson selected Calhoun as his running mate, and together they defeated Adams and his running mate Richard Rush. Calhoun thus became the second of two vice presidents to serve under two different presidents. The only other man who accomplished this feat was George Clinton, who served as vice president from 1805 to 1812 under Thomas Jefferson and James Madison.

During the election, Jackson's aide James Alexander Hamilton attempted a rapprochement between Jackson and Crawford, whom Jackson resented owing partially to the belief that it was he, not Calhoun, who had opposed the invasion of Florida. Hamilton spoke about this prospect with Governor John Forsyth of Georgia, who acted as a mediator between the Jackson campaign and Crawford. Forsyth wrote a letter back to Hamilton in which he claimed that Crawford had stated to him that it was Calhoun, not Crawford, who had supported censuring Jackson for his invasion of Florida. Knowing that the letter could destroy the partnership between Jackson and Calhoun, Hamilton and fellow Jackson aide William B. Lewis allowed it to remain in Hamilton's possession without informing Jackson or the public of its existence.

Petticoat affair

Early in Jackson's administration, Calhoun's wife Floride Bonneau Calhoun organized Cabinet wives (hence the term "petticoats") against Peggy Eaton, wife of Secretary of War John Eaton, and refused to associate with her. They alleged that John and Peggy Eaton had engaged in an adulterous affair while she was still legally married to her first husband, and that her recent behavior was unladylike. The allegations of scandal created an intolerable situation for Jackson. The Petticoat affair ended friendly relations between Calhoun and Jackson.

Jackson sided with the Eatons. He and his late wife Rachel Donelson had undergone similar political attacks stemming from their marriage in 1791. The two had married in 1791 not knowing that Rachel's first husband, Lewis Robards, had failed to finalize the expected divorce. Once the divorce was finalized, they married legally in 1794, but the episode caused a major controversy, and was used against him in the 1828 campaign. Jackson saw attacks on Eaton stemming ultimately from the political opposition of Calhoun, who had failed to silence his wife's criticisms. The Calhouns were widely regarded as the chief instigators. Jackson, who loved to personalize disputes, also saw the Petticoat affair as a direct challenge to his authority, because it involved lower-ranking executive officials and their wives seeming to contest his ability to choose whomever he wanted for his cabinet. Secretary of State Martin Van Buren, a widower, took Jackson's side and defended the Eatons. Van Buren was a northerner and a supporter of the 1828 tariff (which Calhoun bitterly opposed). Calhoun and Van Buren were the main contenders for the vice-presidential nomination in the ensuing election, and the nominee would then presumably be the party's choice to succeed Jackson. That Van Buren sided with the Eatons, in addition to disagreements between Jackson and Calhoun on other issues, mainly the Nullification Crisis, marked him as Calhoun's likely vice presidential successor.

Some historians, including Jackson biographers Richard B. Latner and Robert V. Remini, believe that the hostility towards the Eatons was rooted less in questions of proper behavior than in politics. Eaton had been in favor of the Tariff of Abominations. He was also politically close to Van Buren. Calhoun may have wanted to expel Eaton from the cabinet as a way of boosting his anti-tariff agenda and increasing his standing in the Democratic Party. Many cabinet members were Southern and could be expected to sympathize with such concerns, especially Treasury Secretary Samuel D. Ingham, who was allied with Calhoun and believed that he, not Van Buren, should succeed Jackson as president.

In 1830, reports had emerged accurately stating that Calhoun, as Secretary of War, had favored censuring Jackson for his 1818 invasion of Florida. These infuriated Jackson. Eventually, Lewis decided to reveal the existence of Forsyth's letter, and on April 30, Crawford wrote a second letter, this time to Forsyth, repeating the charge Forsyth represented him as having previously made. Jackson received the letter on May 12, which confirmed his suspicions. He claimed that Calhoun had "betrayed" him. Eaton took his revenge on Calhoun. For reasons unclear, Calhoun asked Eaton to approach Jackson about the possibility of Calhoun publishing his correspondence with Jackson at the time of the Seminole War. Eaton did nothing, leading Calhoun to believe that Jackson had approved the publication of the letters. Calhoun published them in the United States Telegraph, a newspaper edited by a Calhoun protégé, Duff Green. This gave the appearance of Calhoun trying to justify himself against a conspiracy to damage him and further enraged the President.

Finally in the spring of 1831, at the suggestion of Van Buren, who, like Jackson, supported the Eatons, Jackson replaced all but one of his Cabinet members, thereby limiting Calhoun's influence. Van Buren began the process by resigning as Secretary of State, facilitating Jackson's removal of others. Van Buren thereby grew in favor with Jackson, while the rift between the President and Calhoun was widened. Later, in 1832, Calhoun, as vice president, cast a tie-breaking vote against Jackson's nomination of Van Buren as Minister to Great Britain in a failed attempt to end Van Buren's political career. Missouri Senator Thomas Hart Benton, a staunch supporter of Jackson, then stated that Calhoun had "elected a Vice President", as Van Buren was able to move past his failed nomination as Minister to Great Britain and instead gain the Democratic Party's vice-presidential nomination in the 1832 election, in which he and Jackson were victorious.

Nullification

Calhoun had begun to oppose increases in protective tariffs, as they generally benefited Northerners more than Southerners. While he was vice president in the Adams administration, Jackson's supporters devised a high tariff legislation that placed duties on imports that were also made in New England. Calhoun had been assured that the northeastern interests would reject the Tariff of 1828, exposing pro-Adams New England congressmen to charges that they selfishly opposed legislation popular among Jacksonian Democrats in the west and mid-Atlantic States. The southern legislators miscalculated and the so-called "Tariff of Abominations" passed and was signed into law by President Adams. Frustrated, Calhoun returned to his South Carolina plantation, where he anonymously composed South Carolina Exposition and Protest, an essay rejecting the centralization philosophy and supporting the principle of nullification as a means to prevent a tyranny of a central government.

Calhoun supported the idea of nullification through a concurrent majority. Nullification is a legal theory that a state has the right to nullify, or invalidate, any federal law it deems unconstitutional. In Calhoun's words, it is "the right of a State to interpose, in the last resort, in order to arrest an unconstitutional act of the General Government, within its limits". Nullification can be traced back to arguments by Jefferson and Madison in writing the Kentucky and Virginia Resolutions of 1798 against the Alien and Sedition Acts. Madison expressed the hope that the states would declare the acts unconstitutional, while Jefferson explicitly endorsed nullification. Calhoun openly argued for a state's right to secede from the Union, as a last resort to protect its liberty and sovereignty. In his later years, Madison rebuked supporters of nullification, stating that no state had the right to nullify federal law.

In "South Carolina Exposition and Protest", Calhoun argued that a state could veto any federal law that went beyond the enumerated powers and encroached upon the residual powers of the State. President Jackson, meanwhile, generally supported states' rights, but opposed nullification and secession. At the 1830 Jefferson Day dinner at Jesse Brown's Indian Queen Hotel, Jackson proposed a toast and proclaimed, "Our federal Union, it must be preserved." Calhoun replied, "The Union, next to our liberty, the most dear. May we all remember that it can only be preserved by respecting the rights of the states, and distributing equally the benefit and burden of the Union." Calhoun's publication of letters from the Seminole War in the Telegraph caused his relationship with Jackson to deteriorate further, thus contributing to the nullification crisis. Jackson and Calhoun began an angry correspondence that lasted until Jackson stopped it in July.

Jackson supported a revision to tariff rates known as the Tariff of 1832. It was designed to placate the nullifiers by lowering tariff rates. Written by Treasury Secretary Louis McLane, the bill lowered duties from 45% to 27%. In May, Representative John Quincy Adams introduced a slightly revised version of the bill, which Jackson accepted. It passed Congress on July 9 and was signed by the president on July 14. The bill failed to satisfy extremists on either side. In October, the South Carolina legislature voted to call a convention to nullify the tariffs. On November 24, the South Carolina Nullification Convention passed an ordinance nullifying both the Tariff of 1832 and the Tariff of 1828 and threatening to secede if the federal government attempted to enforce the tariffs. In response, Jackson sent U.S. Navy warships to Charleston harbor, and threatened to hang Calhoun or any man who worked to support nullification or secession. After joining the Senate, Calhoun began to work with Clay on a new compromise tariff. A bill sponsored by the administration had been introduced by Representative Gulian C. Verplanck of New York, but it lowered rates more sharply than Clay and other protectionists desired. Clay managed to get Calhoun to agree to a bill with higher rates in exchange for Clay's opposition to Jackson's military threats and, perhaps, with the hope that he could win some Southern votes in his next bid for the presidency. On the same day, Congress passed the Force Bill, which empowered the President of the United States to use military force to ensure state compliance with federal law. South Carolina accepted the tariff, but in a final show of defiance, nullified the Force Bill. In Calhoun's speech against the Force Bill, delivered on February 5, 1833, no longer as vice president, he strongly endorsed nullification, at one point saying:

In his three-volume biography of Jackson, James Parton summed up Calhoun's role in the Nullification crisis: "Calhoun began it. Calhoun continued it. Calhoun stopped it."

Resignation
As tensions over nullification escalated, South Carolina Senator Robert Y. Hayne was considered less capable than Calhoun to represent South Carolina in the Senate debates, so in late 1832 Hayne resigned to become governor; Calhoun resigned as vice president, and the South Carolina legislature elected Calhoun to fill Hayne's Senate seat. Van Buren had already been elected as Jackson's new vice president, meaning that Calhoun had less than three months left on his term anyway. The South Carolina newspaper City Gazette commented on the change:

Biographer John Niven argues "that these moves were part of a well-thought-out plan whereby Hayne would restrain the hotheads in the state legislature and Calhoun would defend his brainchild, nullification, in Washington against administration stalwarts and the likes of Daniel Webster, the new apostle of northern nationalism." Calhoun was the only vice president to resign, until Spiro Agnew in 1973, 141 years later. During his terms as vice president, Calhoun made a record of 31 tie-breaking votes in the Senate.

First term in the U.S. Senate

When Calhoun took his seat in the Senate on December 29, 1832, his chances of becoming president were considered poor due to his involvement in the Nullification Crisis, which left him without connections to a major national party. After the implementation of the Compromise Tariff of 1833, which helped solve the Nullification Crisis, the Nullifier Party, along with other anti-Jackson politicians, formed a coalition known as the Whig Party. Calhoun sometimes affiliated with the Whigs, but chose to remain a virtual independent due to the Whig promotion of federally subsidized "internal improvements".

From 1833 to 1834, Jackson was engaged in removing federal funds from the Second Bank of the United States during the Bank War. Calhoun opposed this action, considering it a dangerous expansion of executive power. He called the men of the Jackson administration "artful, cunning, and corrupt politicians, and not fearless warriors". He accused Jackson of being ignorant about financial matters. As evidence, he cited the economic panic caused by Nicholas Biddle as a means to stop Jackson from destroying the Bank. On March 28, 1834, Calhoun voted with the Whig senators on a successful motion to censure Jackson for his removal of the funds. In 1837, he refused to attend the inauguration of Jackson's chosen successor, Van Buren, even as other powerful senators who opposed the administration, such as Webster and Clay, did witness the inauguration. However, by 1837, Calhoun generally had realigned himself with most of the Democrats' policies.

To restore his national stature, Calhoun cooperated with Van Buren. Democrats were hostile to national banks, and the country's bankers had joined the Whig Party. The Democratic replacement, meant to help combat the Panic of 1837, was the Independent Treasury system, which Calhoun supported and which went into effect. Calhoun, like Jackson and Van Buren, attacked finance capitalism and opposed what he saw as encroachment by government and big business. For this reason, he opposed the candidacy of Whig William Henry Harrison in the 1840 presidential election, believing that Harrison would institute high tariffs and therefore place an undue burden on the Southern economy. Calhoun resigned from the Senate on March 3, 1843, four years before the expiration of his term, and returned to Fort Hill to prepare an attempt to win the Democratic nomination for the 1844 presidential election. He gained little support, even from the South, and quit.

Secretary of State

Appointment and the Annexation of Texas 

When Harrison died in 1841 after a month in office, Vice President John Tyler succeeded him. Tyler, a former Democrat, was expelled from the Whig Party after vetoing bills passed by the Whig congressional majority to reestablish a national bank and raise tariffs. He named Calhoun Secretary of State on April 10, 1844, following the death of Abel P. Upshur, one of six people killed when a cannon exploded during a public demonstration in the USS Princeton disaster.

Upshur's loss was a severe blow to the Tyler administration. When Calhoun was nominated as Upshur's replacement, the White House was well-advanced towards securing a treaty of annexation with Texas. The State Department's secret negotiations with the Texas republic had proceeded despite explicit threats from a suspicious Mexican government that an unauthorized seizure of its northern district of Coahuila y Tejas would be equivalent to an act of war. Both the negotiations with Texas envoys and the garnering of support from the U.S. Senate had been spearheaded aggressively by Secretary Upshur, a strong pro-slavery partisan. Tyler looked to its ratification by the Senate as the sine qua non to his ambition for another term in office. Tyler planned to outflank the Whigs by gaining support from the Democratic Party or possibly creating a new party of [discontented] Northern Democrats and Southern Whigs.

Calhoun, though as avid a proponent for Texas acquisition as Upshur, posed a political liability to Tyler's aims. As secretary of state, Calhoun's political objective was to see that the presidency was placed in the hands of a southern extremist, who would put the expansion of slavery at the center of national policy.

Tyler and his allies had, since 1843, devised and encouraged national propaganda promoting Texas annexation, which understated Southern slaveholders' aspirations regarding the future of Texas. Instead, Tyler chose to portray the annexation of Texas as something that would prove economically beneficial to the nation as a whole. The further introduction of slavery into the vast expanses of Texas and beyond, they argued, would "diffuse" rather than concentrate slavery regionally, ultimately weakening white attachment and dependence on slave labor. This theory was yoked to the growing enthusiasm among Americans for Manifest Destiny, a desire to see the social, economic and moral precepts of republicanism spread across the continent. Moreover, Tyler declared that national security was at stake: If foreign powers—Great Britain in particular—were to gain influence in Texas, it would be reduced to a British cotton-producing reserve and a base to exert geostrategic influence over North America. Texas might be coerced into relinquishing slavery, inducing slave uprisings in adjoining slave states and deepening sectional conflicts between American free-soil and slave-soil interests. The appointment of Calhoun, with his southern states' rights reputation—which some believed was "synonymous with slavery"—threatened to cast doubt on Tyler's carefully crafted reputation as a nationalist. Tyler, though ambivalent, felt obliged to enlist Calhoun as Secretary of State, because Tyler's closest confidantes had, in haste, offered the position to the South Carolinian statesman in the immediate aftermath of the Princeton disaster. Calhoun would be confirmed by Congress by unanimous vote.

In advance of Calhoun's arrival in Washington, D.C., Tyler attempted to quickly finalize the treaty negotiations. Sam Houston, President of the Texas Republic, fearing Mexican retaliation, insisted on a tangible demonstration of U.S. commitments to the security of Texas. When key Texas diplomats failed to appear on schedule, the delay compelled Tyler to bring his new Secretary of State directly into negotiations. Secretary Calhoun was directed to honor former Secretary Upshur's verbal assurances of protection now offered by Calhoun in writing, to provide for U.S. military intervention in the event that Mexico used force to hold Texas. Tyler deployed U.S. Navy vessels to the Gulf of Mexico and ordered army units mobilized, entirely paid for with $100,000 of executive branch contingency funds. The move side-stepped constitutional requirements that Congress authorize appropriations for war.

On April 22, 1844, Secretary Calhoun signed the treaty of annexation and ten days later delivered it to the Senate for consideration in secret session. The details of the treaty negotiations and supporting documents were leaked to the press by Senator Benjamin Tappan of Ohio. Tappan, a Democrat, was an opponent of annexation and of slavery. The terms of the Tyler–Texas treaty and the release of Calhoun's letter to British ambassador Richard Pakenham exposed the annexation campaign as a program to expand and preserve slavery. In the Pakenham letter, Calhoun alleged that the institution of slavery contributed to the physical and mental well-being of Southern slaves. The U.S. Senate was compelled to open its debates on ratification to public scrutiny, and hopes for its passage by the two-thirds majority required by the Constitution were abandoned by administration supporters. In linking Texas annexation to the expansion of slavery, Calhoun had alienated many who might previously have supported the treaty.

On June 8, 1844, after fierce partisan struggles, the Senate rejected the Tyler–Texas treaty by a vote of 16–35, a margin of more than two-to-one. The vote went largely along party lines: Whigs had opposed it almost unanimously (1–27), while Democrats split, but voted largely in favor (15–8). Nevertheless, the disclosure of the treaty placed the issue of Texas annexation at the center of the 1844 general election.

Election of 1844

At the Democratic Convention in Baltimore, Maryland in May 1844, Calhoun's supporters, with Calhoun in attendance, threatened to bolt the proceedings and shift support to Tyler's third party ticket if the delegates failed to produce a pro-Texas nominee. Calhoun's Pakenham letter, and its identification with proslavery extremism, moved the presumptive Democratic Party nominee, the northerner Martin Van Buren, into denouncing annexation. Therefore, Van Buren, already not widely popular in the South, saw his support from that region crippled. As a result, James K. Polk, a pro-Texas Jacksonian and Tennessee politician, won the nomination. Historian Daniel Walker Howe says that Calhoun's Pakenham letter was a deliberate attempt to influence the outcome of the 1844 election, writing:

In the general election, Calhoun offered his endorsement to Polk on condition that he support the annexation of Texas, oppose the Tariff of 1842, and dissolve the Washington Globe, the semi-official propaganda organ of the Democratic Party headed by Francis Preston Blair. He received these assurances and enthusiastically supported Polk's candidacy. Polk narrowly defeated Henry Clay, who opposed annexation. Lame-duck President Tyler organized a joint House–Senate vote on the Texas treaty which passed, requiring only a simple majority. He signed a bill of annexation on March 1, With President Polk's support, the Texas annexation treaty was approved by the Texas Republic in 1845. A bill to admit Texas as the 28th state of the Union was signed by Polk on December 29, 1845.

Second term in the Senate

Mexican–American War and Wilmot Proviso

Calhoun was re-elected to the Senate in 1845 following the resignation of Daniel Elliott Huger. He soon became vocally opposed to the Mexican–American War. He believed that it would distort the national character by undermining republicanism in favor of empire and by bringing non-white persons into the country. When Congress declared war against Mexico on May 13, he abstained from voting on the measure. Calhoun also vigorously opposed the Wilmot Proviso, an 1846 proposal by Pennsylvania Representative David Wilmot to ban slavery in all newly acquired territories. The House of Representatives, through its Northern majority, passed the provision several times. However, the Senate, where non-slave and slave states had more equal representation, never approved the measure.

Oregon boundary dispute
A major crisis emerged from the persistent Oregon boundary dispute between Great Britain and the United States, due to an increasing number of American migrants. The territory included most of present-day British Columbia, Washington, Oregon, and Idaho. American expansionists used the slogan "54–40 or fight" in reference to the Northern boundary coordinates of the Oregon territory. The parties compromised, ending the war threat, by splitting the area down the middle at the 49th parallel, with the British acquiring British Columbia and the Americans accepting Washington and Oregon. Calhoun, along with President Polk and Secretary of State James Buchanan, continued work on the treaty while he was a senator, and it was ratified by a vote of 41–14 on June 18, 1846.

Rejection of the Compromise of 1850 
The Compromise of 1850, devised by Clay and Stephen A. Douglas, a first-term Democratic senator from Illinois, was designed to solve the controversy over the status of slavery in the vast new territories acquired from Mexico. Many pro-slavery Southerners opposed it as inadequate protection for slavery, and Calhoun helped organize the Nashville Convention, which would meet in June to discuss possible Southern secession. The 67-year-old Calhoun had suffered periodic bouts of tuberculosis throughout his life. In March 1850, the disease reached a critical stage. Weeks from death and too feeble to speak, Calhoun wrote a blistering attack on the Compromise that would become his most famous speech. On March 4 a friend and disciple, Senator James Mason of Virginia, read his remarks. Calhoun affirmed the right of the South to leave the Union in response to what he called Northern subjugation, specifically the North's growing opposition to the South's "peculiar institution" of slavery. He warned that the day "the balance between the two sections" was destroyed would be a day not far removed from disunion, anarchy, and civil war. Calhoun queried how the Union might be preserved in light of subjugation of the "weaker" party—the pro-slavery South—by the "stronger" party, the anti-slavery North. He maintained that the responsibility of solving the question lay entirely on the North—as the stronger section, to allow the Southern minority an equal share in governance and to cease its anti-slavery agitation. He added:

Calhoun died soon afterward, and although the Compromise measures did eventually pass, Calhoun's ideas about states' rights attracted increasing attention across the South. Historian William Barney argues that Calhoun's ideas proved "appealing to Southerners concerned with preserving slavery. ...Southern radicals known as 'Fire-Eaters' pushed the doctrine of states' rights to its logical extreme by upholding the constitutional right of the state to secede".

Death, last words, and burial

Calhoun died at the Old Brick Capitol boarding house in Washington, D.C., on March 31, 1850, of tuberculosis, at the age of 68. The last words attributed to him were "The South, the poor South!"

He was interred at St. Philip's Churchyard in Charleston, South Carolina. During the Civil War, a group of Calhoun's friends were concerned about the possible desecration of his grave by Federal troops and, during the night, removed his coffin to a hiding place under the stairs of the church. The next night, his coffin was buried in an unmarked grave near the church, where it remained until 1871 when it was again exhumed and returned to its original place.

After Calhoun had died, an associate suggested that Senator Thomas Hart Benton give a eulogy in honor of Calhoun on the floor of the Senate. Benton, a devoted Unionist, declined, saying: "He is not dead, sir—he is not dead. There may be no vitality in his body, but there is in his doctrines."

The Clemson University campus in South Carolina occupies the site of Calhoun's Fort Hill plantation, which he bequeathed to his wife and daughter. They sold it and its 50 slaves to a relative. When that owner died, Thomas Green Clemson foreclosed the mortgage. He later bequeathed the property to the state for use as an agricultural college to be named after him.

Calhoun's widow, Floride, died on July 25, 1866, and was buried in St. Paul's Episcopal Church Cemetery in Pendleton, South Carolina, near their children, but apart from her husband.

Political philosophy

Agrarian republicanism

Historian LeeH. Cheek, Jr., distinguishes between two strands of American republicanism: the puritan tradition, based in New England, and the agrarian or South Atlantic tradition, which Cheek argues was espoused by Calhoun. While the New England tradition stressed a politically centralized enforcement of moral and religious norms to secure civic virtue, the South Atlantic tradition relied on a decentralized moral and religious order based on the idea of subsidiarity (or localism). Cheek maintains that the "Kentucky and Virginia Resolutions" (1798), written by Jefferson and Madison, were the cornerstone of Calhoun's republicanism. Calhoun emphasized the primacy of subsidiarity—holding that popular rule is best expressed in local communities that are nearly autonomous while serving as units of a larger society.

Slavery
Calhoun led the pro-slavery faction in the Senate, opposing both total abolitionism and attempts such as the Wilmot Proviso to limit the expansion of slavery into the western territories.

Calhoun's father, Patrick Calhoun, helped shape his son's political views. He was a staunch supporter of slavery who taught his son that social standing depended not merely on a commitment to the ideal of popular self-government but also on the ownership of a substantial number of slaves. Flourishing in a world in which slaveholding was a hallmark of civilization, Calhoun saw little reason to question its morality as an adult. He further believed that slavery instilled in the remaining whites a code of honor that blunted the disruptive potential of private gain and fostered the civic-mindedness that lay near the core of the republican creed. From such a standpoint, the expansion of slavery decreased the likelihood for social conflict and postponed the declension when money would become the only measure of self-worth, as had happened in New England. Calhoun was thus firmly convinced that slavery was the key to the success of the American dream.

Whereas other Southern politicians had excused slavery as a "necessary evil", in a famous speech on the Senate floor on February 6, 1837, Calhoun asserted that slavery was a "positive good". He rooted this claim on two grounds: white supremacy and paternalism. All societies, Calhoun claimed, are ruled by an elite group that enjoys the fruits of the labor of a less-exceptional group. Senator William Cabell Rives of Virginia earlier had referred to slavery as an evil that might become a "lesser evil" in some circumstances. Calhoun believed that conceded too much to the abolitionists:

Calhoun's treatment of his own slaves includes an incident in 1831, when his slave Alick ran away when threatened with a severe whipping. Calhoun wrote to his second cousin and brother-in-law, asking him to keep a lookout for Alick, and if he was taken, to have him "severely whipped" and sent back.  When Alick was captured, Calhoun wrote to the captor:

Calhoun rejected the belief of Southern leaders such as Henry Clay that all Americans could agree on the "opinion and feeling" that slavery was wrong, although they might disagree on the most practicable way to respond to that great wrong. Calhoun's constitutional ideas acted as a viable conservative alternative to Northern appeals to democracy, majority rule, and natural rights.

As well as providing the intellectual justification of slavery, Calhoun played a central role in devising the South's overall political strategy. According to Phillips:

Shortly after delivering his speech against the Compromise of 1850, Calhoun predicted the destruction of the Union over the slavery issue. Speaking to Senator Mason, he said:

Opposition to the War with Mexico

Calhoun was consistently opposed to the War with Mexico, arguing that an enlarged military effort would only feed the alarming and growing lust of the public for empire regardless of its constitutional dangers, bloat executive powers and patronage, and saddle the republic with a soaring debt that would disrupt finances and encourage speculation. Calhoun feared, moreover, that Southern slave owners would be shut out of any conquered Mexican territories, as nearly happened with the Wilmot Proviso. He argued that the war would detrimentally lead to the annexation of all of Mexico, which would bring Mexicans into the country, whom he considered deficient in moral and intellectual terms. He said, in a speech on January 4, 1848:

Anti-slavery Northerners denounced the war as a Southern conspiracy to expand slavery; Calhoun in turn perceived a connivance of Yankees to destroy the South. By 1847 he decided the Union was threatened by a totally corrupt party system. He believed that in their lust for office, patronage and spoils, politicians in the North pandered to the anti-slavery vote, especially during presidential campaigns, and politicians in the slave states sacrificed Southern rights in an effort to placate the Northern wings of their parties. Thus, the essential first step in any successful assertion of Southern rights had to be the jettisoning of all party ties. In 1848–49, Calhoun tried to give substance to his call for Southern unity. He was the driving force behind the drafting and publication of the "Address of the Southern Delegates in Congress, to Their Constituents". It alleged Northern violations of the constitutional rights of the South, then warned Southern voters to expect forced emancipation of slaves in the near future, followed by their complete subjugation by an unholy alliance of unprincipled Northerners and blacks. Whites would flee and the South would "become the permanent abode of disorder, anarchy, poverty, misery, and wretchedness". Only the immediate and unflinching unity of Southern whites could prevent such a disaster. Such unity would either bring the North to its senses or lay the foundation for an independent South. But the spirit of union was still strong in the region and fewer than 40% of the Southern congressmen signed the address, and only one Whig.

Many Southerners believed his warnings and read every political news story from the North as further evidence of the planned destruction of the white southern way of life. The climax came a decade after Calhoun's death with the election of Republican Abraham Lincoln in 1860, which led to the secession of South Carolina, followed by six other Southern states. They formed the new Confederate States, which, in accordance with Calhoun's theory, did not have any organized political parties.

Concurrent majority

Calhoun's basic concern for protecting the diversity of minority interests is expressed in his chief contribution to political science—the idea of a concurrent majority across different groups as distinguished from a numerical majority. A concurrent majority is a system in which a minority group is permitted to exercise a sort of veto power over actions of a majority that are believed to infringe upon the minority's rights.

According to the principle of a numerical majority, the will of the more numerous citizens should always rule, regardless of the burdens on the minority. Such a principle tends toward a consolidation of power in which the interests of the absolute majority always prevail over those of the minority. Calhoun believed that the great achievement of the American constitution was in checking the tyranny of a numerical majority through institutional procedures that required a concurrent majority, such that each important interest in the community must consent to the actions of government. To secure a concurrent majority, those interests that have a numerical majority must compromise with the interests that are in the minority. A concurrent majority requires a unanimous consent of all the major interests in a community, which is the only sure way of preventing tyranny of the majority. This idea supported Calhoun's doctrine of interposition or nullification, in which the state governments could refuse to enforce or comply with a policy of the Federal government that threatened the vital interests of the states.

Historian Richard Hofstadter (1948) emphasizes that Calhoun's conception of minority was very different from the minorities of a century later:

Unlike Jefferson, Calhoun rejected attempts at economic, social, or political leveling, claiming that true equality could not be achieved if all classes were given equal rights and responsibilities. Rather, to ensure true prosperity, it was necessary for a stronger group to provide protection and care for the weaker one. This meant that the two groups should not be equal before the law. For Calhoun, "protection" (order) was more important than freedom. Individual rights were something to be earned, not something bestowed by nature or God. Calhoun was concerned with protecting the interests of the Southern States (which he identified with the interests of their slaveholding elites) as a distinct and beleaguered minority among the members of the federal Union; his idea of a concurrent majority as a protection for minority rights has gained some acceptance in American political thought. Political scientist Malcolm Jewell argues, "The decision-making process in this country resembles John Calhoun's 'concurrent majority': A large number of groups both within and outside the government must, in practice, approve any major policy."

Calhoun's ideas on the concurrent majority are illustrated in A Disquisition on Government. The Disquisition is a 100-page essay on Calhoun's definitive and comprehensive ideas on government, which he worked on intermittently for six years until its 1849 completion. It systematically presents his arguments that a numerical majority in any government will typically impose a despotism over a minority unless some way is devised to secure the assent of all classes, sections, and interests and, similarly, that innate human depravity would debase government in a democracy.

State sovereignty and the "Calhoun Doctrine"
In the 1840s three interpretations of the constitutional powers of Congress to deal with slavery in territories emerged: the "free-soil doctrine," the "popular sovereignty position," and the "Calhoun doctrine". The Free Soilers stated that Congress had the power to outlaw slavery in the territories. The popular sovereignty position argued that the voters living there should decide. The Calhoun doctrine said that neither Congress nor the citizens of the territories could outlaw slavery in the territories.

In what historian Robert R. Russell calls the "Calhoun Doctrine", Calhoun argued that the Federal Government's role in the territories was only that of the trustee or agent of the several sovereign states: it was obliged not to discriminate among the states and hence was incapable of forbidding the bringing into any territory of anything that was legal property in any state. Calhoun argued that citizens from every state had the right to take their property to any territory. Congress and local voters, he asserted, had no authority to place restrictions on slavery in the territories. In a February 1847 speech before the Senate, Calhoun declared that "the enactment of any law which should directly, or by its effects, deprive the citizens of any of the States of this Union from emigrating, with their property, in to any of the territories of the United States, will make such discrimination and would therefore be a violation of the Constitution". Enslavers therefore had a fundamental right to take their property wherever they wished. As constitutional historian Hermann von Holst noted, "Calhoun's doctrine made it a solemn constitutional duty of the United States government and of the American people to act as if the existence or non-existence of slavery in the Territories did not concern them in the least." The Calhoun Doctrine was opposed by the Free Soil forces, which merged into the new Republican Party around 1854. Chief Justice Roger B. Taney used Calhoun's arguments in his decision in the 1857 Supreme Court case Dred Scott v. Sandford, in which he ruled that the federal government could not prohibit slavery in any of the territories.

Legacy

Monuments and memorials

Many different places, streets, and schools were named after Calhoun, as may be seen on the list linked above.  Some, such as Springfield, Illinois (1832) and Jackson County, Kansas (1859), were subsequently renamed.  The "Immortal Trio" (Calhoun, Daniel Webster, and Henry Clay) were memorialized with streets in Uptown New Orleans.

In June 2020, Clemson University removed John C. Calhoun's name from Clemson University Calhoun Honors College, renaming it to Clemson University Honors College. This action was taken in response to a petition which was supported by NFL stars DeAndre Hopkins and Deshaun Watson who are Clemson University alumni. Against the backdrop of the George Floyd protests, University chairman Smyth McKissick said that "we must recognize there are central figures in Clemson's history whose ideals, beliefs and actions do not represent the university's core values of respect and diversity".

The Confederate government honored Calhoun on a 1¢ postage stamp, which was printed in 1862 but was never officially released.

In 1887, at the height of the Jim Crow era, white segregationists erected a monument to Calhoun in Marion Square in Charleston, South Carolina; the base was within easy reach and the local black population defaced it. Finally, it was replaced in 1896 standing atop a column base at a total of 115 feet as well as fenced in to deter attackers. It continued as a target of vandalism regardless. The statue has been a topic of debate for a long time. In 2017, Charleston's city council deferred a proposal to put a plaque on the statue that would have stated his white-supremacist views. It was No. 5 on the Make It Right Project's 2018 list of the 10 Confederate monuments it most wanted removed. The Make It Right Project organized a protest at the monument on May 16, 2019. The monument was removed on June 24, 2020 following a unanimous vote by the Charleston City Council to relocate the monument. The removal of this monument was featured on the 5th episode in the 7th season of Southern Charm.

In 1910, the state of South Carolina gave a statue of John C. Calhoun to the National Statuary Hall Collection.

The USS JohnC. Calhoun, in commission from 1963 to 1994, was a Fleet Ballistic Missile nuclear submarine.

In 1817, surveyors sent by Secretary of War Calhoun to map the area around Fort Snelling named the largest lake in what became Minneapolis, Minnesota, for him. Two centuries later, the city of Minneapolis renamed the lake with the Dakota language name Bde Maka Ska, meaning "White Earth Lake" or "White Banks Lake". The Calhoun-Isles Community Band in the Uptown district of Minneapolis changed its name to City of Lakes Community Band in November 2018, to distance itself from Calhoun's pro-slavery legacy, following the renaming of the lake. Calhoun Square and Calhoun Beach Club, both in Minneapolis, announced name changes, and the road around the lake was renamed Bde Maka Ska Parkway. In 2022, the city councilors of Savannah, Georgia, voted unanimously to remove his name from Calhoun Square.

Film and television
Calhoun was portrayed by actor Arliss Howard in the 1997 film Amistad. The film depicts the controversy and legal battle surrounding the status of slaves who in 1839 rebelled against their transporters on the La Amistad slave ship.

Historical reputation
Calhoun was despised by Jackson and his supporters for his alleged attempts to subvert the unity of the nation for his own political gain. On his deathbed, Jackson regretted that he had not had Calhoun executed for treason. "My country," he declared, "would have sustained me in the act, and his fate would have been a warning to traitors in all time to come." Even after his death, Calhoun's reputation among Jacksonians remained poor. They disparaged him by portraying him as a man thirsty for power, who when he failed to attain it, sought to tear down his country with him.

According to Parton, writing in 1860:

Writing more than thirty years after Calhoun's death, James G. Blaine portrayed him as a mix of personal integrity and wrongheaded ideology:

Calhoun is often remembered for his defense of minority rights, in the context of defending white Southern interests from perceived Northern threats, by use of the "concurrent majority". He is also noted and criticized for his strong defense of slavery. These positions played an enormous role in influencing Southern secessionist leaders by strengthening the trend of sectionalism, thus contributing to the Civil War.
 
Biographer Irving Bartlett wrote:

Calhoun has been held in regard by some Lost Cause of the Confederacy historians, who hold a romanticized view of the antebellum Southern way of life and its cause during the Civil War. Historians such as Charles M. Wiltse and Margaret Coit have, in their writings, portrayed Calhoun as a sympathetic or heroic figure.

John Niven paints a portrait of Calhoun that is both sympathetic and tragic. He says that Calhoun's ambition and personal desires "were often thwarted by lesser men than he". Niven identifies Calhoun as a "driven man and a tragic figure". He argues that Calhoun was motivated by the near-disaster of the War of 1812, of which he was a "thoughtless advocate," to work towards fighting for the freedoms and securities of the white Southern people against any kind of threat. Ultimately, Niven says, he "... would overcompensate and in the end would more than any other individual destroy the culture he sought to preserve, perpetuating for several generations the very insecurity that had shaped his public career".

In 1957, a five-member "special" committee, led by Senator John F. Kennedy, selected Calhoun as one of the five senators to enter the newly created senatorial pantheon "hall of fame". This "hall of fame" was established to fill five vacant portrait spaces in the Senate Reception Room.

Recently, Calhoun's reputation has suffered particularly due to his defense of slavery. The racially motivated Charleston church shooting in South Carolina in June 2015 reinvigorated demands for the removal of monuments dedicated to prominent pro-slavery and Confederate States figures. That month, the monument to Calhoun in Charleston was found vandalized, with spray-painted denunciations of Calhoun as a racist and a defender of slavery. Later, in 2020, during the George Floyd protests in South Carolina, the monument was vandalized with signs and spray paint, with calls from the public demanding its removal, causing the city of Charleston to erect a chain-link fence around the statue to prevent the public from accessing it, before announcing on June 23, 2020, that the statue would be removed.

In response to decades of requests, Yale President Peter Salovey announced in 2017 that the university's Calhoun College would be renamed to honor Grace Murray Hopper, a pioneering computer programmer, mathematician and Navy rear admiral who graduated from Yale. Calhoun is commemorated elsewhere on the campus, including the exterior of Harkness Tower, a prominent campus landmark, as one of Yale's "Eight Worthies".

See also
 List of places named for John C. Calhoun
 List of United States Congress members who died in office (1790–1899)

References

Bibliography

Biographies

 
 ; popular biography
 ; outdated
 
 
 
 "John Caldwell Calhoun." Dictionary of American Biography (1936) online

Specialized studies

Primary sources

Further reading

 
 
 
 
  Excerpts from scholars.

External links

 
 
 
 John C. Calhoun: A Resource Guide from the Library of Congress
 University of Virginia: John C. Calhoun – Timeline, quotes, & contemporaries, via University of Virginia
 Other images via The College of New Jersey: John C. Calhoun, Bust of John C. Calhoun, John C. Calhoun.
 Birthplace of Calhoun Historical Marker
 The Law Offices of John C. Calhoun Monument
 Disquisition on Government and other papers by John Calhoun.
 John C. Calhoun Papers at Clemson University's Special Collections Library
 2015 petition to Charleston City Council to change the name of Calhoun Street

|-

|-

|-

|-

|-

|-

|-

|-

 
1782 births
1850 deaths
19th-century vice presidents of the United States
19th-century deaths from tuberculosis
1824 United States vice-presidential candidates
1828 United States vice-presidential candidates
American people of the War of 1812
American people of Scotch-Irish descent
American people of the Seminole Wars
American political philosophers
American planters
American proslavery activists
American slave owners
American white supremacists
American Unitarians
Burials in South Carolina
Calhoun family
Democratic Party (United States) vice presidential nominees
Democratic Party United States senators from South Carolina
Democratic Party vice presidents of the United States
Democratic-Republican Party members of the United States House of Representatives from South Carolina
Democratic-Republican Party vice presidents of the United States
Great Triumvirate
Tuberculosis deaths in Washington, D.C.
Jackson administration cabinet members
John Quincy Adams administration cabinet members
Litchfield Law School alumni
Yale College alumni
Monroe administration cabinet members
National Register of Historic Places in Litchfield County, Connecticut
Nullifier Party politicians
Nullifier Party United States senators
People from Abbeville, South Carolina
South Carolina Democrats
South Carolina lawyers
Tyler administration cabinet members
United States Secretaries of State
United States Secretaries of War
Vice presidents of the United States
Origins of the American Civil War
Nullification crisis
U.S. Congressional gag rules and their sponsors
Conservatism in the United States
United States senators who owned slaves